Aliabad (also Romanized as ‘Alīābād) is a village in Jam Rural District, in the Central District of Jam County, Bushehr Province, Iran. At the 2006 census, its population was 904, in 189 families.

References 

Populated places in Jam County